Waru Station (WR) is a class II railway station located in Kedungrejo, Waru, Sidoarjo Regency, East Java, Indonesia included in the Surabaya VIII Operation Area at an altitude of . The station is strategically located on the Surabaya–Sidoarjo main route and close to Purabaya Bus Station.

However, a plan for the construction of the Waru–Buduran frontage road resulted in the activity being completely moved to Kalimas Station, since early 2015.

Services
The following is a list of train services at the Waru Station.
 Economy class
 Local economy:
 Commuter:

References

External links
 

Sidoarjo Regency
Railway stations in East Java
railway stations opened in 1878
1870s establishments in the Dutch East Indies